Sweden held a general election on the 20 September 1970. This was the final general election being held before the municipal reform that cut the number of municipalities to below 290. This was the first unicameral Riksdag elected.

National results

Results by region

Percentage share

By votes

Constituency results

Percentage share

By votes

Results by municipality
1970 was the final election where the postal votes were counted separately from the polling station votes in one unified count across municipalities. The exception to these results are those where the whole constituency was one municipality - namely Gothenburg, Gotland and Stockholm where all postal votes were automatically denoted as part of said municipalities.

Blekinge

Dalarna

Dalarna County was known as Kopparberg County at the time, but shared the same borders as in the 21st century.

Kopparberg County

There was a discrepancy of three votes between the Kopparberg County's official count (173,240 votes) and the municipality and post ballot-based list (173,243 votes). This difference accounted for 0.00173% of the overall vote and thus did not change any percentages.

Gotland

Gävleborg

Halland

Jämtland

Jönköping

Kalmar

Kronoberg

Norrbotten

Skåne
The province of Skåne, later unified into one county, was divided into Malmöhus and Kristianstad counties at the time, also resulting in three separate constituencies, one for each county and a third for the metropolitan area of Öresund, that was part of Malmöhus.

Four-city constituency
()

Kristianstad

Malmöhus County

Stockholm
Stockholm County was divided into Stockholm Municipality and the surrounding county of suburbs or more rural areas.

Stockholm (city)

Stockholm County

Södermanland

Uppsala

Värmland

Västerbotten

Västernorrland

Västmanland

Västra Götaland
The later iteration of Västra Götaland County was divided into three separate counties and five constituencies in 1973. The three counties were Gothenburg and Bohuslän, Skaraborg and Älvsborg. Gothenburg/Bohus were divided into one constituency representing Gothenburg Municipality and one representing Bohuslän, whereas Älvsborg was divided into two constituencies, one in the north and one in the south. Skaraborg had one constituency for the whole county.

Bohuslän

Gothenburg

Skaraborg

Älvsborg N

Älvsborg S

Örebro

Östergötland

References

General elections in Sweden